Lake Johnston may refer to:

Places
In Australia
 Lake Johnston (Western Australia), a lake in the Mallee (biogeographic region)

In Canada
 Rural Municipality of Lake Johnston No. 102, Saskatchewan